La Shondra David Mosa'ati (born 15 May 1996) is a male Tongan sprinter. He competed in the men's  100 metres event at the 2015 World Championships in Athletics in Beijing, China.

See also
 Tonga at the 2015 World Championships in Athletics

References

1996 births
Living people
Place of birth missing (living people)
Tongan male sprinters
World Athletics Championships athletes for Tonga
21st-century Tongan people